The Samsung Galaxy A7 (2015) is an Android phablet manufactured by Samsung Electronics and released in February 2014. The phone was not released in the United States.

History 
The Samsung Galaxy A7 serves as one of the successors to the Samsung Galaxy Alpha. It was released alongside the Samsung Galaxy A3 and A5. It was first released with Android 4.4.4 KitKat, however, Android Android 6.0.1 Marshmallow was made available for the phone via a software update in June 2016. It serves as the high-end variant of the Galaxy A series. It was succeeded by the Samsung Galaxy A7 (2016).

Features 
The Samsung Galaxy A7 features a 5.5-inch super-AMOLED display, and a front and rear camera of 5 and 13 megapixels, respectively. The phone has a micro-USB port that can be used for charging as well as transferring data. In terms of wireless connectivity, the phone supports Wi-Fi 802.11a/b/g/n, as well as mobile hotspot capability (if supported by the carrier). Built into the Galaxy A7 are accelerometer, proximity, compass and light sensors.

References 

Samsung smartphones
Android (operating system) devices
Mobile phones introduced in 2015